The Wanggamala people, also spelt Wangkamahdla, Wangkamadla, Wangkamanha, Wangkamana, Wonkamala, Wongkamala, Wonkamudla, and other variants, are an Aboriginal Australian people of the Northern Territory and Queensland.

Country
They roamed north-west of Annandale, at Kalidawarry and around the lower Field and Hay rivers, along the Plenty river, and on the eastern margins of the Simpson Desert. River waters were ephemeral and they dug native wells (mikari).

Language

Their language was Wanggamala, which is now extinct.

Economy
The Wanggamala lived in areas where the native tobacco pituri grows and, aside from using it themselves, they employed it as a valuable trading resource.

Alternative names

Tharlimanha (Breen 2007)
Wanggamala (AIATSIS and Ethnologue)
Wanggamanha
Wangkamadla 
Wangkamahdla
Wangkamala
Wangkamana (Horton, after Tindale; Blake & Breen 1971)
Wangkamanha
Wonggaman (AIAS)
Wonggawan
Wongkamala (Tindale)
 Wonkamala (Tindale 1974)
 Wonkamudla(Tindale 1974; O'Grady et al 1996; Mathews)

Notes

Citations

Sources

Aboriginal peoples of the Northern Territory